List matches of Serbia men's national volleyball team conducted by Slobodan Kovač, who was announced a coach of Serbian national team on August 19, 2019. to October 23, 2021.

Achievements

2019 Official matches

2019 CEV European Championship

* All times are Central European Summer Time (UTC+02:00)

Pool B 
Venue:  Palais 12, Brussels, Belgium

|-bgcolor=#CCFFCC 
|}

Venue:  Sportpaleis, Antwerp, Belgium

|-bgcolor=#CCFFCC
|-bgcolor=#CCFFCC
|-bgcolor=#CCFFCC
|-bgcolor=#CCFFCC
|}

Round of 16 
Venue:  Palais 12, Brussels, Belgium
|-bgcolor=#CCFFCC
|}

Quarterfinals 
Venue:  Omnisport Apeldoorn, Apeldoorn, Netherlands
|-bgcolor=#CCFFCC
|}

Semifinals 
Venue:  AccorHotels Arena, Paris, France
|-bgcolor=#CCFFCC
|}

Final 
Venue:  AccorHotels Arena, Paris, France
|-bgcolor=#CCFFCC
|}

2020 Official matches

2020 European Olympics qualification

Venue:  Max-Schmeling-Halle, Berlin, Germany
* All times are Central European Time (UTC+01:00)

Pool B

|-bgcolor=#ffcccc 
|-bgcolor=#CCFFCC 
|-bgcolor=#ffcccc 
|}

2021 Official matches

2021 FIVB Nations League

Venue:  Rimini Fiera, Rimini, Italy
* All times are Central European Summer Time (UTC+02:00)

Week 1

|-bgcolor=#CCFFCC
|-bgcolor=#ffcccc
|-bgcolor=#CCFFCC
|}

Week 2

|-bgcolor=#CCFFCC
|-bgcolor=#CCFFCC
|-bgcolor=#ffcccc
|}

Week 3

|-bgcolor=#CCFFCC
|-bgcolor=#CCFFCC
|-bgcolor=#CCFFCC
|}

Week 4

|-bgcolor=#ffcccc
|-bgcolor=#CCFFCC
|-bgcolor=#ffcccc
|}

Week 5

|-bgcolor=#CCFFCC
|-bgcolor=#CCFFCC
|-bgcolor=#ffcccc
|}

2021 CEV European Championship

* All times are Central European Summer Time (UTC+02:00)

Pool A
Venue:  Tauron Arena, Kraków, Poland

|-bgcolor=#CCFFCC
|-bgcolor=#CCFFCC
|-bgcolor=#ffcccc
|-bgcolor=#CCFFCC
|-bgcolor=#CCFFCC
|}

Round of 16 
Venue:  Ergo Arena, Gdańsk, Poland

|-bgcolor=#CCFFCC
|}

Quarterfinals 
Venue:  Ergo Arena, Gdańsk, Poland

|-bgcolor=#CCFFCC
|}

Semifinals 
Venue:  Spodek, Katowice, Poland

|-bgcolor=#ffcccc
|}

3rd place match
Venue:  Spodek, Katowice, Poland

|-bgcolor=#ffcccc
|}

2019 Friendly matches

Preparatory game
Venue:  Arena Stožice, Ljubljana, Slovenia
* All times are Central European Summer Time (UTC+02:00)

Slovenia - Serbia (3 Sep 2019)

|-bgcolor=#CCFFCC
|}

Slovenia - Serbia (4 Sep 2019)

|-bgcolor=#CCFFCC
|}

2021 Friendly matches

Preparatory game for 2021 FIVB Nations League

Venue:  Srebrno Jezero, Veliko Gradište, Serbia
* All times are Central European Summer Time (UTC+02:00)

Serbia - North Macedonia (14 May 2021)

|-bgcolor=#CCFFCC
|}

Venue:  Arena Stožice, Ljubljana, Slovenia
* All times are Central European Summer Time (UTC+02:00)

|-bgcolor=#ffcccc 
|-bgcolor=#ffcccc 
|-bgcolor=#CCFFCC 
|-bgcolor=#CCFFCC 
|-bgcolor=#CCFFCC 
|-bgcolor=#ffcccc 
|}

Preparatory game for 2021 CEV European Championship

Venue:  Zaporizhzhia, Ukraine
* All times are Eastern European Summer Time (UTC+03:00)

|-bgcolor=#CCFFCC
|-bgcolor=#CCFFCC
|-bgcolor=#ffcccc
|}

See also
Serbia men's national volleyball team
Matches of Serbian men's volleyball national team conducted by Nikola Grbić

References

National men's volleyball teams
Men's European Volleyball Championships
FIVB Volleyball Men's Nations League
Serbian volleyball coaches
Serbian men's volleyball players
Men's sport in Serbia
Volleyball in Serbia